Tatsuki Shinotsuka (篠塚辰樹, born 7 May 1998) is a Japanese kickboxer and former boxer, currently competing in the featherweight division of K-1.

Combat Press ranked him as the #10 ranked Super Flyweight in the world between July and August 2021.

Boxing career
Shinotsuka made his boxing debut against Izuki Tomioka on December 14, 2016. He lost the fight by unanimous decision.

Shinotsuka was scheduled to face  Chanchai Khowaka on March 28, 2017. He won the fight by a first-round knockout.

Shinotsuka was scheduled to face  Tasuku Suwa on June 8, 2017. He won the fight by unanimous decision, with scores of 58–55, 59–55, 59–54.

Shinotsuka was scheduled to make his last professional boxing appearance, before his transition to kickboxing, against Takehiro Shinohara on October 12, 2017. He won the fight by a first-round technical knockout.

Kickboxing career

RISE

Early RISE career
Shinotsuka was scheduled to make his kickboxing debut against Kensei Yamakawa at RISE 122 on February 4, 2018. He entered the sport as a highly regarded prospect, owing to his boxing career and affiliation with the Teppen Gym. He won the fight by a first-round knockout, stopping Yamakawa with a left hook at the 1:16 minute mark.

Shinotsuka was scheduled to face the six-fight RISE veteran Masahide Kudo at RISE 123 on March 24, 2018. Kudo won the fight by a second-round technical knockout, managing to knock Shinotsuka down three times by the halfway point of the round. All knockdowns resulted from repeated low kicks to the lead leg.

Five-fight winning streak
Shinotsuka was scheduled to face Shinya Hanzawa at RISE 125 on June 17, 2018. He won the fight by a third-round knockout, stopping Hanzawa with a left hook with thirty seconds left in the bout.

Shinotsuka was scheduled to face Kenta Yagami at RISE 127 on September 16, 2018. He won the fight by a first-round technical knockout.

Shinotsuka was scheduled to fight Jin Lee at RISE 129 on November 17, 2018. He won the fight by a first-round technical knockout. Shinotsuka knocked Lee down with a combination of a right straight and left hook midway through the round. Although Lee was able to stand up in time for the eight-count, he was unsteady on his feet, forcing the referee to stop the fight.

Shinotsuka fought Ryuki Kaneda at RISE 130 on February 3, 2019. He won the fight by unanimous decision, with all three judges scoring the fight 29–28 in his favor.

Shinotsuka was scheduled to face Ruka at RISE World Series 2019: First Round on March 10, 2019. He won the fight by a first-round knockout, needing just 61 seconds to stop Ruka with a right straight.

Departure from Teppen Gym
For his last fight of 2019, Shinotsuka was scheduled to fight Yoshihisa Morimoto at RISE 132 on May 19, 2019. The closely contested bout was ruled a majority draw after the first three rounds were fought, with one judge awarding Shinotsuka a 30-29 scorecard, while the other two judges scored it as a 29–29 draw. Morimoto was awarded a split decision, after an extra round was fought. Following this loss, Shinotsuka left Teppen Gym and began training with Target Shibuya.

Shinotsuka made his sole appearance of 2020 against Ryoga Hirano at RISE 137 on February 23, 2020. He won the fight by a first-round knockout.

K-1
On January 1, 2021, Shinotsuka announced his departure from Target Shibuya.

Shinotsuka was scheduled to make his promotional debut against Kaito Ozawa at K'Festa 4 Day 1 on March 21, 2021. The fight was ruled a majority draw after the first three rounds were fought, with two of the judges scoring the bout as 30-30, while the third judge scored the bout as 30–29 in Shinotsuka's favor. Shinotsuka was awarded a split decision after an extra round was fought. Shinotsuka revealed during the post-fight conference that he entered the fight with a broken right hand and an injured leg.

Shinotsuka was scheduled to face Toma Tanabe at K-1 World GP 2021: Yokohamatsuri on September 20, 2021. A month before the event, Shinotsuka withdrew from the bout, due to a hand and neck injury he sustained during training.

Shinotsuka was scheduled to challenge the reigning Krush Featherweight champion Takahito Niimi at Krush 132 on December 18, 2021. He lost the fight by a second-round knockout, after being knocked down a total of four times. The first knockdown came early in the opening round, while the remaining three happened in the third round.

Shinotsuka was expected to face Yusuke at Krush 141 on September 24, 2022. He withdrew from the fight on September 9, due to a proximal phalanx bone fracture of a toe on his right foot.

Shinotsuka faced Yuta Hayashi at Krush 147 on March 25, 2023.

Fight record

|-  style="text-align:center; background:#"
| 2023-03-25 || || align=left| Yuta Hayashi || Krush 147 || Tokyo, Japan ||   ||  || 
|-
|-  style="text-align:center; background:#fbb"
| 2021-12-18 || Loss || align=left| Takahito Niimi || Krush 132 || Tokyo, Japan || KO (Punches + knee)  || 2 || 2:57 
|-
! style=background:white colspan=9 |
|-  style="background:#cfc;"
| 2021-03-21 || Win ||align=left| Kaito Ozawa || K'Festa 4 Day 1 || Tokyo, Japan || Ext. R Decision (Split) || 4 ||3:00
|-  style="background:#cfc;"
| 2020-02-23 || Win ||align=left| Ryoga Hirano || RISE 137 || Tokyo, Japan || KO (Right knee) || 1 || 1:50
|-  style="background:#fbb;"
| 2019-05-19 || Loss ||align=left| Yoshihisa Morimoto || RISE 132 || Tokyo, Japan || Ext. R. Decision (Split) || 4 || 3:00
|-  style="background:#cfc;"
| 2019-03-10 || Win ||align=left| Ruka || RISE World Series 2019: First Round || Ota, Japan || KO (Right straight) || 1 || 1:01
|-  style="background:#cfc;"
| 2019-02-03 || Win ||align=left| Ryuki Kaneda || RISE 130 || Tokyo, Japan || Decision (Unanimous) || 3 || 3:00
|-  style="background:#cfc;"
| 2018-11-17 || Win ||align=left| Jin Lee || RISE 129 || Tokyo, Japan || TKO (Punches) || 1 || 1:34
|-  style="background:#cfc;"
| 2018-09-16 || Win ||align=left| Kenta Yagami || RISE 127 || Tokyo, Japan || TKO (Punches) || 1 || 1:49
|-  style="background:#cfc;"
| 2018-06-17 || Win ||align=left| Shinya Hanzawa || RISE 125 || Chiba, Japan || KO (Left hook) || 3 || 2:33
|-  style="background:#fbb;"
| 2018-03-24 || Loss ||align=left| Masahide Kudo || RISE 123 || Tokyo, Japan || TKO (Three knockdowns) || 2 || 1:34
|-  style="background:#cfc;"
| 2018-02-04 || Win ||align=left| Kensei Yamakawa || RISE 122 || Tokyo, Japan || KO (Left hook) || 1 || 1:16
|-
| colspan=9 | Legend:

Professional boxing record

|-
|4
|Win
|3–1
|style="text-align:left;"| Takehiro Shinohara
|TKO
|1 (8) ||1:09
|12 October 2017
|style="text-align:left;"| 
|style="text-align:left;"|
|-
|3
|Win
|2–1
|style="text-align:left;"| Tasuku Suwa
|UD
|6 ||
|8 June 2017
|style="text-align:left;"| 
|style="text-align:left;"|
|-
|2
|Win
|1–1
|style="text-align:left;"| Chanchai Khowaka
|KO
|1 (6)||3:09
|28 March 2017
|style="text-align:left;"| 
|style="text-align:left;"|
|-
|1
|Loss
|0–1
|style="text-align:left;"| Izuki Tomioka
|UD
|6||
|14 December 2016
|style="text-align:left;"| 
|style="text-align:left;"|
|-
|colspan=10| Legend:

See also
 List of male kickboxers

References

Japanese kickboxers
1998 births
Living people
Japanese male kickboxers
Sportspeople from Ibaraki Prefecture
21st-century Japanese people